Lakšárska Nová Ves is a village and municipality in Senica District in the Trnava Region of western Slovakia.

History
In historical records the village was first mentioned in 1296.

Geography
The municipality lies at an altitude of 229 metres and covers an area of 36.939 km2. It has a population of about 1025 people.

References

External links

 Official page
https://web.archive.org/web/20080111223415/http://www.statistics.sk/mosmis/eng/run.html

Villages and municipalities in Senica District